This is a list of foreign ministers in 2004.

Africa
 Algeria - Abdelaziz Belkhadem (2000–2005)
 Angola - João Bernardo de Miranda (1999–2008)
 Benin - Rogatien Biaou (2003–2006)
 Botswana - Mompati Merafhe (1994–2008)
 Burkina Faso - Youssouf Ouedraogo (1999–2007)
 Burundi - Terence Sinunguruza (2001–2005)
 Cameroon -
François Xavier Ngoubeyou (2001–2004)
Laurent Esso (2004–2006)
 Cape Verde -
 Fátima Veiga (2002–2004)
 Víctor Borges (2004–2008)
 Central African Republic - Charles Wénézoui (2003–2005)
 Chad - Nagoum Yamassoum (2003–2005)
 Comoros - Mohamed El-Amine Souef (2002–2005)
 Republic of Congo - Rodolphe Adada (1997–2007)
 Democratic Republic of Congo -
 Antoine Ghonda (2003–2004)
 Raymond Ramazani Baya (2004–2007)
 Côte d'Ivoire - Bamba Mamadou (2003–2006)
 Djibouti - Ali Abdi Farah (1999–2005)
 Egypt -
 Ahmed Maher (2001–2004)
 Ahmed Aboul Gheit (2004–2011)
 Equatorial Guinea - Pastor Micha Ondó Bile (2003–2012)
 Eritrea - Ali Said Abdella (2000–2005)
 Ethiopia - Seyoum Mesfin (1991–2010)
 Gabon - Jean Ping (1999–2008)
 The Gambia -
 Baboucarr-Blaise Jagne (2001–2004)
 Sidi Moro Sanneh (2004–2005)
 Ghana - Nana Akufo-Addo (2003–2007)
 Guinea -
 François Lonseny Fall (2002–2004)
 Mamady Condé (2004–2006)
 Guinea-Bissau -
 João José Monteiro (2003–2004)
 Soares Sambu (2004–2005)
 Kenya -
 Kalonzo Musyoka (2003–2004)
 Chirau Ali Mwakwere (2004–2005)
 Lesotho -
Mohlabi Tsekoa (2002–2004)
Monyane Moleleki (2004–2007)
 Liberia - Thomas Nimely (2003–2006)
 Libya - Abdel Rahman Shalgham (2000–2009)
 Madagascar - Marcel Ranjeva (2002–2009)
 Malawi -
 Lilian Patel (2000–2004)
 George Chaponda (2004–2005)
 Mali -
 Lassana Traoré (2002–2004)
 Moctar Ouane (2004–2011)
 Mauritania - Mohamed Vall Ould Bellal (2003–2005)
 Mauritius - Jaya Krishna Cuttaree (2003–2005)
 Morocco - Mohamed Benaissa (1999–2007)
 Western Sahara - Mohamed Salem Ould Salek (1998–2023)
 Mozambique - Leonardo Simão (1994–2005)
 Namibia -
 Hidipo Hamutenya (2002–2004)
 Marco Hausiku (2004–2010)
 Niger - Aïchatou Mindaoudou (2001–2010)
 Nigeria - Oluyemi Adeniji (2003–2006)
 Rwanda - Charles Murigande (2002–2008)
 São Tomé and Príncipe -
 Mateus Meira Rita (2002–2004)
 Óscar Sousa (2004)
 Ovídio Manuel Barbosa Pequeno (2004–2006)
 Senegal - Cheikh Tidiane Gadio (2000–2009)
 Seychelles - Jérémie Bonnelame (1997–2005)
 Sierra Leone - Momodu Koroma (2002–2007)
 Somalia -
Yusuf Hassan Ibrahim (2002–2004)
Abdullahi Sheikh Ismail (2004–2006)
 Somaliland - Edna Adan Ismail (2003–2006)
 South Africa - Nkosazana Dlamini-Zuma (1999–2009)
 Sudan - Mustafa Osman Ismail (1998–2005)
 Swaziland - Mabili Dlamini (2003–2006)
 Tanzania - Jakaya Kikwete (1995–2005)
 Togo - Kokou Tozoun (2003–2005)
 Tunisia -
 Habib Ben Yahia (1999–2004)
 Abdelbaki Hermassi (2004–2005)
 Uganda -
 James Wapakhabulo (2001–2004)
 Tom Butime (2004–2005)
 Zambia - Kalombo Mwansa (2002–2005)
 Zimbabwe - Stan Mudenge (1995–2005)

Asia
 Afghanistan - Abdullah Abdullah (2001–2006)
 Armenia - Vartan Oskanian (1998–2008)
 Azerbaijan -
 Vilayat Guliyev (1999–2004)
 Elmar Mammadyarov (2004–2020)
 Nagorno-Karabakh -
Ashot Gulyan (2002–2004)
Arman Melikyan (2004–2005)
 Bahrain - Sheikh Muhammad ibn Mubarak ibn Hamad Al Khalifah (1971–2005)
 Bangladesh - Morshed Khan (2001–2006)
 Bhutan - Khandu Wangchuk (2003–2007)
 Brunei - Pengiran Muda Mohamed Bolkiah (1984–2015)
 Cambodia - Hor Namhong (1998–2016)
 China - Li Zhaoxing (2003–2007)
 East Timor - José Ramos-Horta (2000–2006)
 Georgia -
 Tedo Japaridze (2003–2004)
 Salome Zourabichvili (2004–2005)
 Abkhazia -
 Sergei Shamba (1997–2004)
 Georgy Otyrba (acting) (2004)
 Igor Akhba (2004)
 Sergei Shamba (2004–2010)
 South Ossetia - Murat Dzhioyev (1998–2012)
 India -
 Yashwant Sinha (2002–2004)
 Natwar Singh (2004–2005)
 Indonesia - Hassan Wirajuda (2001–2009)
 Iran - Kamal Kharazi (1997–2005)
 Iraq - Hoshyar Zebari (2003–2014)
 Israel - Silvan Shalom (2003–2006)
 Palestinian Authority - Nabil Shaath (2003–2005)
 Japan -
 Yoriko Kawaguchi (2002–2004)
 Nobutaka Machimura (2004–2005)
 Jordan -
 Marwan al-Muasher (2002–2004)
 Hani al-Mulki (2004–2005)
 Kazakhstan - Kassym-Jomart Tokayev (2002–2007)
 North Korea - Paek Nam-sun (1998–2007)
 South Korea -
 Yoon Young-kwan (2003–2004)
 Ban Ki-moon (2004–2006)
 Kuwait - Sheikh Mohammad Sabah Al-Salem Al-Sabah (2003–2011)
 Kyrgyzstan - Askar Aitmatov (2002–2005)
 Laos - Somsavat Lengsavad (1993–2006)
 Lebanon -
 Jean Obeid (2003–2004)
 Mahmoud Hammoud (2004–2005)
 Malaysia - Syed Hamid Albar (1999–2008)
 Maldives - Fathulla Jameel (1978–2005)
 Mongolia -
 Luvsangiin Erdenechuluun (2000–2004)
 Tsendiin Mönkh-Orgil (2004–2006)
 Myanmar -
 Win Aung (1998–2004)
 Nyan Win (2004–2011)
 Nepal -
 Surya Bahadur Thapa (2003–2004)
 Bhekh Bahadur Thapa (2004)
 Sher Bahadur Deuba (2004–2005)
 Oman - Yusuf bin Alawi bin Abdullah (1982–2020)
 Pakistan - Khurshid Mahmud Kasuri (2002–2007)
 Philippines -
 Delia Albert (2003–2004)
 Alberto Romulo (2004–2011)
 Qatar - Sheikh Hamad bin Jassim bin Jaber Al Thani (1992–2013)
 Saudi Arabia - Prince Saud bin Faisal bin Abdulaziz Al Saud (1975–2015)
 Singapore -
 S. Jayakumar (1994–2004)
 George Yeo (2004–2011)
 Sri Lanka -
 Tyronne Fernando (2001–2004)
 Lakshman Kadirgamar (2004–2005)
 Syria - Farouk al-Sharaa (1984–2006)
 Taiwan -
 Eugene Chien (2002–2004)
 Mark Chen (2004–2006)
 Tajikistan - Talbak Nazarov (1994–2006)
 Thailand - Surakiart Sathirathai (2001–2005)
 Turkey - Abdullah Gül (2003–2007)
 Turkmenistan - Raşit Meredow (2001–present)
 United Arab Emirates - Rashid Abdullah Al Nuaimi (1980–2006)
 Uzbekistan - Sodiq Safoyev (2003–2005)
 Vietnam - Nguyễn Dy Niên (2000–2006)
 Yemen - Abu Bakr al-Qirbi (2001–2014)

Australia and Oceania
 Australia - Alexander Downer (1996–2007)
 Fiji - Kaliopate Tavola (2000–2006)
 French Polynesia -
 Gaston Flosse (1991–2004)
 Oscar Temaru (2004)
 Gaston Flosse (2004–2005)
 Kiribati - Anote Tong (2003–2016)
 Marshall Islands - Gerald Zackios (2001–2008)
 Micronesia - Sebastian Anefal (2003–2007)
 Nauru -
 René Harris (2003–2004)
 David Adeang (2004–2007)
 New Zealand - Phil Goff (1999–2005)
 Cook Islands -
 Robert Woonton (1999–2004)
 Tom Marsters (2004–2005)
 Niue - Young Vivian (2002–2008)
 Palau - Temmy Shmull (2001–2009)
 Papua New Guinea - Sir Rabbie Namaliu (2002–2006)
 Samoa - Tuilaepa Aiono Sailele Malielegaoi (1998–2021)
 Solomon Islands - Laurie Chan (2002–2006)
 Tonga -
 Prince 'Ulukalala Lavaka Ata (1998–2004)
 Sonatane Tu'a Taumoepeau Tupou (2004–2009)
 Tuvalu -
 Saufatu Sopoanga (2002–2004)
 Maatia Toafa (2004–2006)
 Vanuatu -
 Moana Carcasses Kalosil (2003–2004)
 Barak Sopé (2004)
 Marcellino Pipite (2004)
 Sato Kilman (2004–2007)

Europe
 Albania - Kastriot Islami (2003–2005)
 Andorra - Juli Minoves Triquell (2001–2007)
 Austria -
 Benita Ferrero-Waldner (2000–2004)
 Ursula Plassnik (2004–2008)
 Belarus - Sergei Martynov (2003–2012)
 Belgium -
 Louis Michel (1999–2004)
 Karel De Gucht (2004–2009)
 Brussels-Capital Region - Guy Vanhengel (2000–2009)
 Flanders -
 Patricia Ceysens (2003–2004)
 Geert Bourgeois (2004–2008)
 Wallonia - Marie-Dominique Simonet (2004–2009)
 Bosnia and Herzegovina - Mladen Ivanić (2003–2007)
 Bulgaria - Solomon Passy (2001–2005)
 Croatia - Miomir Žužul (2003–2005)
 Cyprus - Georgios Iacovou (2003–2006)
 Northern Cyprus -
 Tahsin Ertuğruloğlu (1998–2004)
 Serdar Denktaş (2004–2006)
 Czech Republic - Cyril Svoboda (2002–2006)
 Denmark - Per Stig Møller (2001–2010)
 Greenland - Josef Motzfeldt (2003–2007)
 Estonia - Kristiina Ojuland (2002–2005)
 Finland - Erkki Tuomioja (2000–2007)
 France -
 Dominique de Villepin (2002–2004)
 Michel Barnier (2004–2005)
 Germany - Joschka Fischer (1998–2005)
 Greece -
 George Papandreou (1999–2004)
 Tassos Giannitsis (acting) (2004)
 Petros Molyviatis (2004–2006)
 Hungary -
 László Kovács (2002–2004)
 Ferenc Somogyi (2004–2006)
 Iceland -
 Halldór Ásgrímsson (1995–2004)
 Davíð Oddsson (2004–2005)
 Ireland -
 Brian Cowen (2000–2004)
 Dermot Ahern (2004–2008)
 Italy -
 Franco Frattini (2002–2004)
 Gianfranco Fini (2004–2006)
 Latvia -
 Sandra Kalniete (2002–2004)
 Rihards Pīks (2004)
 Helēna Demakova (acting) (2004)
 Artis Pabriks (2004–2007)
 Liechtenstein - Ernst Walch (2001–2005)
 Lithuania - Antanas Valionis (2000–2006)
 Luxembourg -
 Lydie Polfer (1999–2004)
 Charles Goerens (2004)
 Jean Asselborn (2004–present)
 Macedonia - Ilinka Mitreva (2002–2006)
 Malta -
 Joe Borg (1999–2004)
 John Dalli (2004)
 Michael Frendo (2004–2008)
 Moldova -
 Nicolae Dudău (2001–2004)
 Andrei Stratan (2004–2009)
 Transnistria - Valeriy Litskai (2000–2008)
 Netherlands - Ben Bot (2003–2007)
 Norway - Jan Petersen (2001–2005)
 Poland - Włodzimierz Cimoszewicz (2001–2005)
 Portugal -
 Teresa Patrício de Gouveia (2003–2004)
 António Monteiro (2004–2005)
 Romania -
 Mircea Geoană (2000–2004)
 Mihai Răzvan Ungureanu (2004–2007)
 Russia -
 Igor Ivanov (1998–2004)
 Sergey Lavrov (2004–present)
 San Marino - Fabio Berardi (2003–2006)
 Serbia and Montenegro -
 Goran Svilanović (2000–2004)
 Vuk Drašković (2004–2007)
 Montenegro -
 Dragiša Burzan (2003–2004)
 Miodrag Vlahović (2004–2006)
 Slovakia - Eduard Kukan (1998–2006)
 Slovenia -
 Dimitrij Rupel (2000–2004)
 Ivo Vajgl (2004)
 Dimitrij Rupel (2004–2008)
 Spain -
 Ana de Palacio y del Valle-Lersundi (2002–2004)
 Miguel Ángel Moratinos (2004–2010)
 Sweden - Laila Freivalds (2003–2006)
 Switzerland - Micheline Calmy-Rey (2003–2011)
 Ukraine - Kostyantyn Gryshchenko (2003–2005)
 United Kingdom - Jack Straw (2001–2006)
 Vatican City - Archbishop Giovanni Lajolo (2003–2006)

North America and the Caribbean
 Antigua and Barbuda -
 Lester Bird (1991–2004)
 Harold Lovell (2004–2005)
 The Bahamas - Fred Mitchell (2002–2007)
 Barbados - Dame Billie Miller (1994–2008)
 Belize - Godfrey Smith (2003-2003)
 Canada -
 Bill Graham (2002–2004)
 Pierre Pettigrew (2004–2006)
 Quebec - Monique Gagnon-Tremblay (2003–2008)
 Costa Rica - Roberto Tovar Faja (2002–2006)
 Cuba - Felipe Pérez Roque (1999–2009)
 Dominica - Osborne Riviere (2001–2005)
 Dominican Republic -
 Frank Guerrero Prats (2003–2004)
 Carlos Morales Troncoso (2004–2014)
 El Salvador -
 María Eugenia Brizuela de Ávila (1999–2004)
 Francisco Laínez (2004–2008)
 Grenada - Elvin Nimrod (2000–2008)
 Guatemala -
 Edgar Armando Gutiérrez Girón (2002–2004)
 Jorge Briz Abularach (2004–2006)
 Haiti -
 Joseph Philippe Antonio (2001–2004)
 Yvon Siméon (2004–2005)
 Honduras - Leonidas Rosa Bautista (2003–2005)
 Jamaica - Keith Desmond Knight (2001–2006)
 Mexico - Luis Ernesto Derbez (2003–2006)
 Netherlands Antilles - Etienne Ys (2004–2006)
 Nicaragua - Norman José Caldera Cardenal (2002–2007)
 Panama -
 Harmodio Arias Cerjack (2003–2004)
 Samuel Lewis Navarro (2004–2009)
 Puerto Rico – Jose Izquierdo Encarnacion (2003–2005)
 Saint Kitts and Nevis - Timothy Harris (2001–2008)
 Saint Lucia -
 Julian Hunte (2001–2004)
 Petrus Compton (2004–2006)
 Saint Vincent and the Grenadines - Louis Straker (2001–2005)
 Trinidad and Tobago - Knowlson Gift (2001–2006)
 United States - Colin Powell (2001–2005)

South America
 Argentina - Rafael Bielsa (2003–2005)
 Bolivia - Juan Ignacio Siles (2003–2005)
 Brazil - Celso Amorim (2003–2011)
 Chile -
 Soledad Alvear (2000–2004)
 Ignacio Walker Prieto (2004–2006)
 Colombia - Carolina Barco (2002–2006)
 Ecuador - Patricio Zuquilanda (2003–2005)
 Guyana - Rudy Insanally (2001–2008)
 Paraguay - Leila Rachid de Cowles (2003–2006)
 Peru - Manuel Rodríguez Cuadros (2003–2005)
 Suriname - Marie Levens (2000–2005)
 Uruguay - Didier Opertti (1998–2005)
 Venezuela -
 Roy Chaderton (2002–2004)
 Jesús Pérez (2004)
 Alí Rodríguez Araque (2004–2006)

2004 in international relations
Foreign ministers
2004